Simon Patrick Douro Hoare (born 27 June 1981), known by the stage-name Sam Hoare, is a British actor and director known for his role as rower Dickie Burnell, alongside Matt Smith, in BBC One Olympic drama Bert and Dickie (2012).

Hoare wrote and directed his début feature film, Having You,  which was premièred in May 2013 on Sky Movies.

Early life and education 
Born Simon Patrick Douro Hoare, he is the son of the late Timothy James Douro Hoare and his former wife "Linda" Kinvara Cayzer, the granddaughter of Herbert Cayzer, 1st Baron Rotherwick. Hoare was educated at Eton College, and then read Philosophy and Psychology at the University of Edinburgh, where he performed in a number of plays at the student theatre.

Acting career 
Hoare went on to perform on stage, including productions at the Chichester Theatre, Shakespeare's Globe and The Theatre Royal Haymarket, for a 6-month run of Breakfast at Tiffany's directed by Sean Mathias. Alongside his theatrical and TV appearances, including Eastenders and Doctors, Hoare appeared in films; with Nicole Kidman in The Golden Compass and Samuel L. Jackson in Captain America.

After his role in Bert & Dickie in 2012, Hoare guest-starred in BBC1's Father Brown and in Stephen Poliakoff's BBC2 drama Dancing on the Edge, as well as a comedy lead in Blandings for BBC1, based on the celebrated stories of P.G. Wodehouse; also starring Jennifer Saunders, Timothy Spall, David Walliams and Paloma Faith.

Hoare played the role of production assistant Douglas Camfield in the BBC drama An Adventure in Space and Time to celebrate the 50th Anniversary of Doctor Who.

As director and writer 
Hoare has directed a number of music videos and two short films; Training Day which was accepted into several major festivals including the Rushes Soho Shorts Festival and the Encounters International Film Festival; and more recently, Babysitting starring Romola Garai, Dan Stevens and Imogen Stubbs.

Alongside Having You, Hoare has a number of feature writing projects in development, as well as a TV pilot Underperforming which is currently in development with Finite Films.

Personal life
In March 2013 the actress Romola Garai gave birth to their daughter. Hoare and Garai were married in July 2014.

Filmography

External links

References 

1981 births
Living people
People educated at Eton College
Alumni of the University of Edinburgh
21st-century English male actors
English film directors
English film actors